Livio Franceschini (14 April 1913 – 20 November 1975) was an Italian basketball player who competed in the 1936 Summer Olympics. He was born and died in Trieste. Franceschini was part of the Italian basketball team that finished seventh in the Olympic tournament. He played four matches.

References

External links
 
part 7 the basketball tournament

1913 births
Year of death missing
Italian men's basketball players
Olympic basketball players of Italy
Basketball players at the 1936 Summer Olympics
Sportspeople from Trieste
20th-century Italian people